Earl Ottir (died 918), also known as Ottir the Black, was a jarl who occupied a prominent position among the Norse of Britain and Ireland in the early 10th century. He is believed to be the founder of the settlement, Veðrafjǫrðr (present day Waterford) in the year 914. From 917 to his death in 918 Ottir was a close associate of the powerful overking Ragnall ua Ímair, although they are not known to have been related.

Ireland and family
In Ireland, Ottir is particularly associated with raiding and conquests in the province of Munster. The Cogad Gáedel re Gallaib describes him raiding there alongside Ragnall and associates this with the Viking settlement of Cork. Their base for this activity was present day Waterford Harbour. Later the same epic describes Ottir conquering the eastern part of Munster from his seat at Waterford, but it is unclear if he ruled it as king outright or was in any way subject to Ragnall, because the annals offer a different chronology.

Joan Radner has suggested that Ottir is identical to the Ottir mac Iargni who is recorded in the Annals of Ulster killing a son of Auisle in alliance with Muirgel daughter of Máel Sechnaill mac Máele Ruanaid in 883, but Clare Downham describes this identification as "by no means certain". Mary Valante in any case assumes this Ottar and Muirgel were married because he and his father Iercne (died 852) were apparently allies of Máel Sechnaill. Ottir may also have been the father of Bárid mac Oitir who is recorded killed in battle against Ragnall in 914, although this is far from certain because of Ottir's own close association with Ragnall.

England and Scotland

Earl Ottir had a significant career in Britain as well.

Anglo-Saxon Chronicle
Under the year 918 (for 917), the Anglo-Saxon Chronicle reports:

Another Chronicle scribe, writing in the Worcester Manuscript (p. 99), states that Ohtor and Hroald captured the bishop, Cameleac, in AD 915 and that the jarls were killed in the same year. Their deaths occurred in the battle at "Killdane Field" (or "Kill Dane") in Weston-under-Penyard, per the Herefordshire Historic Environment Record reference no. 12549.

Death in battle
Ottir died in battle against Constantine II of Scotland in 918. He either joined forces with Ragnall ua Ímair and others, or alternatively may have led a separate expedition on his own. The Annals of the Four Masters report:

While the Annals of Ulster give a detailed account and place him in Ragnall's army:

The latter describes what is referred to as the Battle of Corbridge.

See also
 Cotter family
 Ohthere of Hålogaland

Notes

References

Primary sources
 Anglo-Saxon Chronicle, tr. 
 
  
 Cogad Gáedel re Gallaib, ed. & tr. James Henthorn Todd (1867). Cogadh Gaedhel re Gallaibh: The War of the Gaedhil with the Gaill. London: Longmans, Green, Reader, and Dyer.
 Fragmentary Annals of Ireland, ed. & tr. Joan Radner (1978). Fragmentary Annals of Ireland. DIAS. edition and translation available at CELT.
  Historia Regum, ed. John Hodgson Hinde (1868). Symeonis Dunelmensis Opera et Collectanea.  Publications of the Surtees Society. Volume 51. Durham: Andrews and Co.
Secondary sources
 Downham, Clare, "The historical importance of Viking-Age Waterford", The Journal of Celtic Studies 4 (2004): 71–96.
 Downham, Clare, Viking Kings of Britain and Ireland: The Dynasty of Ívarr to A.D. 1014. Edinburgh: Dunedin. 2007.
  Also JSTOR.
 Lewis, Stephen M., "Óttar ’s Story – A Dublin Viking in Brittany, England and Ireland, A.D. 902-918".
 Steenstrup, Johannes, Normannerne, Volumes 3 and 4. Copenhagen: Forlagt af Rudolf Klein. 1882.
 Valante, Mary A., The Vikings in Ireland: Settlement, Trade and Urbanization. Four Courts Press. 2008.

918 deaths
10th-century rulers of the Kingdom of the Isles
10th-century Irish people
Norse-Gaels
Viking rulers
People from Waterford (city)
History of Waterford (city)
Monarchs killed in action
Year of birth unknown
10th-century Vikings